Garfield at Large is the first compilation book of Garfield comic strips. The book was originally published by Ballantine Books in the United States in 1980 and the strips date from June 19, 1978, to January 22, 1979. This book introduced the "Garfield Format" to the comic book market. Prior to its publication, comic strip compilations were most commonly formatted like a standard paperback book with the panels running down the page. Jim Davis, Garfield's author, disliked the idea and convinced Ballantine to print the strips from left to right, as they would have appeared in the newspaper. This resulted in the final product being shorter from top to bottom and much wider from side to side than the average paperback book. The book was #1 on The New York Times bestseller list for almost two years.

In the original editions, the strips were published in black and white, including the Sunday strips, which appeared in color originally in their newspaper format. Garfield at Large has since been republished in full color in 2001 as part of the "Garfield Classics" series and as part of a “Fat Cat 3-Pack” (pack containing the first three books for a discounted price) in 1993 and 2001, the latter with its strips in full color. The colorized editions correct an error present in all previous editions: the July 23, 1978 strip originally had the first panel (Garfield hopping down the stairs) printed as the fourth panel.

In popular culture
Champ Kind, Brick Tamland, and Brian Fantana read this book in the Will Ferrell comedy film Anchorman 2: The Legend Continues, which takes place in the year 1980, when this was the only Garfield comic strip compilation published at the time. Even earlier in the film, there was a poster of an orange striped cat that read "I hate Mondays".
Stewie Griffin reads this book in the Family Guy episode "North by North Quahog", describing Garfield's disdain for Nermal (despite the fact that Nermal actually first appears in the third book, Garfield Bigger Than Life).

References 

Garfield at Large (1980–2001 edition)
Garfield: Fat Cat 3-Pack (1993–2001 edition)

Garfield mass media and merchandise
1980 books
Ballantine Books books
Books about cats
Children's books